Gale Herbert Gillingham (February 3, 1944 – October 20, 2011) was a professional football player, a guard for ten seasons in the National Football League (NFL) with the Green Bay Packers (1966–1974, 1976).

Born in Madison, Wisconsin, Gillingham grew up on a farm in nearby Stoughton. His family moved to Little Falls, Minnesota, when he was in high school and he played college football at the University of Minnesota, where he was a teammate of future Kansas City Chiefs defensive end Aaron Brown, whom he faced in Super Bowl I.

Gillingham was the thirteenth overall selection of the 1966 NFL Draft, and in his rookie season, he alternated as the starter at left guard with veteran Fuzzy Thurston. During the 1967 season, he took Thurston's spot full-time, opposite perennial All-Pro Jerry Kramer. He started the Ice Bowl and Super Bowl II, coach Vince Lombardi's final games after nine seasons with the team.

Gillingham was the last member of the Lombardi-era Packers to be active with the franchise. By time he retired, Bart Starr, whom he blocked for in the first two Super Bowl wins, was the team's head coach. Gillingham was a five-time Pro Bowler (1969, '70, '71, '73 and '74), six-time All Pro (1968, '69, '70, '71, '73, '74, and a two-time AP NFL First-team All Pro (1969 and '70).  Gillingham was selected as the inaugural winner of the Forrest Gregg Award for the NFL Offensive Lineman of the Year following the 1970 season.  He was the NFC choice as the NFLPA/Coca-Cola Offensive Lineman of the Year for 1971. He retired a few months after the 1976 season, was inducted into the Green Bay Packers Hall of Fame in 1982.

The only season he was not on offense was 1972 when head coach Dan Devine inexplicably shifted him to the defensive line after the pre-season, even though Gillingham was the team's best offensive lineman. During that campaign, the success of the Packers' offense heavily depended on a strong running attack led by MacArthur Lane and John Brockington. Devine's move failed when Gillingham sustained a season-ending knee injury two games into the regular season, and he was criticized for eventually being a factor in diminishing the team's playoff run.

After his playing days, Gillingham was in the real estate business in Minnesota and retired in 2010. Noted for his brute strength, he was one of the first players in the NFL to use weight training to stay in playing shape during the offseason. His oldest son, Karl, is a Professional Strongman and has competed in two Worlds Strongest Man competitions. Middle son, Brad, is a 6 time World Champion powerlifter with several National and World Records. Youngest son, Wade, is a former Professional Strongman and is widely regarded as having one of the best grips in the world.

Gillingham died at age 67 in 2011 in Little Falls.

In 2016, the Professional Football Researchers Association named Gillingham to the PFRA Hall of Very Good Class of 2016

References

External links
 
 
 

1944 births
2011 deaths
American football offensive guards
Minnesota Golden Gophers football players
Green Bay Packers players
Western Conference Pro Bowl players
National Conference Pro Bowl players
People from Little Falls, Minnesota
Players of American football from Wisconsin
Players of American football from Minnesota